An ashram is a spiritual hermitage or a monastery in Indian religions.

Etymology
The Sanskrit noun  is a thematic nominal derivative from the root   'toil' (< PIE *ḱremh2) with the prefix  'towards.' An ashram is a place where one strives towards a goal in a disciplined manner. Such a goal could be ascetic, spiritual, yogic or any other.

Overview

An ashram would traditionally, but not necessarily in contemporary times, be located far from human habitation, in forests or mountainous regions, amidst refreshing natural surroundings conducive to spiritual instruction and meditation. The residents of an ashram regularly performed spiritual and physical exercises, such as the various forms of yoga. Other sacrifices and penances, such as yajnas, were also performed. Many ashrams also served as gurukulas, residential schools for children under the guru-shishya tradition.

Sometimes, the goal of a pilgrimage to the ashram was not tranquility, but instruction in some art, especially warfare. In the Ramayana, the princes of ancient Ayodhya, Rama and Lakshmana, go to Vishvamitra's ashram to protect his yajnas from being defiled by emissary-demons of Ravana. After they prove their mettle, the princes receive martial instruction from the sage, especially in the use of divine weapons. In the Mahabharata, Krishna, in his youth, goes to the ashram of Sandipani to gain knowledge of both intellectual and spiritual matters.

Schools in Maharashtra
Boarding schools, especially in the tribal areas of Maharashtra and elsewhere in India, are called ashram shala or ashram schools. One such school is the Lok Biradari Prakalp Ashram Shala.

In the West
A number of ashrams have been established outside India. Typically, these ashrams are connected to Indian lineages, focus on imparting Yoga-related teachings, often in residential retreats, and are headed by spiritual teachers (Indians or Western).

See also
Parbrahm Ashram

References

External links

 
Asceticism
Hindu architecture
Hindu monasticism